Marquis Ai of Jin, ancestral name Ji (姬), given name Guang (光), was the fifteenth ruler of the state of Jin. He was also the fifth ruler of Jin in the Spring and Autumn period. He reigned for nine years.

In 710 BC, the eighth year of his reign, Marquis Ai of Jin attacked a small state south of Jin called Xingting (陘廷). The next year, Xingting, allied with Duke Wu of Quwo, sacked Yi (翼), the capital of Jin.  After getting his half-uncle, Han Wan, to kill an escaping Marquis Ai of Jin, The Zhou king ensured that Ai's son, Marquis Xiaozi of Jin, became the next ruler of Jin.

Monarchs of Jin (Chinese state)
8th-century BC Chinese monarchs
709 BC deaths
8th-century BC murdered monarchs
Assassinated Chinese politicians
Year of birth unknown